Paul William Zellinsky Sr. (February 21, 1933 – August 28, 2015)  was a politician in the American state of Washington.

He attended Seattle University and the University of Washington. He owned a car dealership.

Zellinsky, a Democrat, represented District 23 (parts of Kitsap County) in the Washington House of Representatives from 1984 to 1994, and as a Republican from 1996 to 1998.

He was married to Joanne and had two children. They resided in Bremerton, Washington. On August 28, 2015, he died at the age of 82 in Bremerton.

References

1933 births
2015 deaths
American automobile salespeople
Businesspeople from Washington (state)
Seattle University alumni
University of Washington alumni
Washington (state) Democrats
Washington (state) Republicans
Members of the Washington House of Representatives
People from Bremerton, Washington
20th-century American businesspeople